Lyrna was an inland town of ancient Lycia or Caria, inhabited during Hellenistic times. Its name does not occur among ancient authors, but is inferred from epigraphic and other evidence.

Its site is tentatively located near Çukurhisar in Asiatic Turkey.

References

Populated places in ancient Caria
Populated places in ancient Lycia
Former populated places in Turkey
History of Muğla Province